Bouabdallah "Bob" Tahri (born 20 December 1978) is a retired
middle-distance and long-distance French runner, who was born in Metz. He competed mainly in the 3000 m steeplechase distance. He also competes in the 2000 m steeplechase, 1500 m, mile, 3000 m, 5000 m, 10000 m and cross-country running. He has won several medals at major international championships such as the World Championships, European Championships and the European Indoor Championships. Moreover, he has won medals in the European Cup, European Team Championships, IAAF World Cup, IAAF Continental Cup and the IAAF World Athletics Final.

In June 2009, Tahri improved his 2000 m outdoor steeplechase European record with a run of 5:15.36 in Nancy, France. He set a new 3000 m outdoor steeplechase European record of 8:01.18 in finishing third in the final of the 2009 World Championships in Berlin. On 25 June 2010, Tahri set a new world-record time of 5:13.47 in the 2000m outdoor steeplechase race in Tomblaine, France. The previous world-record time of 5:14.43 was set on 21 Aug 1990 by Julius Kariuki. But Tahri's 2000m outdoor steeplechase world record was broken only 5 days later by his compatriot Mahiedine Mekhissi-Benabbad. On 29 June 2010, Tahri won the 3000m outdoor steeplechase race in Metz in the world's fastest time (8:03.72) of the year. He retired after running 3000 meters at the 2016 IAAF Diamond League meeting in Paris.

Notable results (3000 m steeplechase, unless otherwise stated; only the position in the final is indicated)
 2013 European Team Championships - gold medal (3000 m)
 2013 European Team Championships - silver medal (5000 m)
 2011 World Championships - fourth place 
 2010 Continental Cup - bronze medal (5000 m)
 2010 European Championships - silver medal
 2009 World Athletics Final - bronze medal
 2009 World Championships - bronze medal
 2009 European Indoor Championships - silver medal (3000 m)
 2008 World Athletics Final - seventh place
 2008 Olympic Games - fifth place
 2007 World Athletics Final - fourth place
 2007 World Championships - fifth place
 2007 European Indoor Championships - silver medal (3000 m)
 2007 European Cup - gold medal (3000 m)
 2006 IAAF World Cup - bronze medal
 2006 World Athletics Final - bronze medal
 2006 European Championships - bronze medal
 2005 European Cup - silver medal (5000 m)
 2005 World Athletics Final - fifth place
 2005 World Championships - eighth place
 2004 European Cup - gold medal
 2004 Olympic Games - seventh place
 2003 World Athletics Final - fifth place (3000 m)
 2003 World Championships - fourth place
 2002 European Cup - gold medal
 2002 European Championships - fourth place
 2001 European Cup - gold medal
 2001 World Championships - fifth place
 2001 World Indoor Championships - eleventh place (3000 m)
 2000 European Cup - gold medal
 1999 World Championships - twelfth place
 1998 European Championships - tenth place
 1996 World Junior Championships - seventh place

References

External links

 
 

1978 births
Living people
French sportspeople of Algerian descent
French male middle-distance runners
French male long-distance runners
French male steeplechase runners
Athletes (track and field) at the 2000 Summer Olympics
Athletes (track and field) at the 2004 Summer Olympics
Athletes (track and field) at the 2008 Summer Olympics
Olympic athletes of France
Sportspeople from Metz
World Athletics Championships medalists
European Athletics Championships medalists
20th-century French people
21st-century French people